Antennaria monocephala, the pygmy pussytoes, is a flowering plant in the family Asteraceae. It is native to arctic and alpine regions of North America (Greenland, Labrador, Quebec, the three Canadian Arctic Territories, Alaska, British Columbia, Alberta, and Wyoming) as well as the Chukotka (Chukchi) Peninsula of Russia.

Antennaria monocephala is a small herb rarely more than 15 cm (6 inches) tall. Male and female flowers are borne on separate plants; some populations are known in which all the individuals are female.

Subspecies
 Antennaria monocephala subsp. angustata (Greene) Hultén 
 Antennaria monocephala subsp. monocephala

References

External links
Alaska Wildflowers, Antennaria monocephala DC. photos
Paul Slichter, The Sunflower Family in Denali National Park and Preserve, Cat's Paw, Pygmy Pussytoes, Single-headed Pussytoes Antennaria monocephala ssp. monocephala  photos
Flora of the Canadian Arctic Archipelago by S.G. Aiken, M.J. Dallwitz, L.L. Consaul, C.L. McJannet, R.L. Boles, G.W. Argus, J.M. Gillett, P.J. Scott, R. Elven, M.C. LeBlanc, L.J. Gillespie, A.K. Brysting, H. Solstad, and J.G. Harris, Antennaria monocephala (Torr. and A. Gray) DC. subsp. angustata (Greene) Hultén
Растительный мир ООПТ Чукотки, Региональные геологические и водные памятники природы Геологический памятник природы "АНЮЙСКИЙ", Беликович А.В., Галанин А.В., Афонина О.М., Макарова И.И. Публикуется по тексту: Беликович А.В., Галанин А.В., Афонина О.М., Макарова И.И. Растительный мир особо охраняемых территорий Чукотки . Владивосток: БСИ ДВО РАН, 2006. 260 с. in Russian

monocephala
Plants described in 1897
Flora of the Russian Far East
Flora of Subarctic America
Flora of Canada
Flora of the Northwestern United States
Flora without expected TNC conservation status